Longarone is a town and comune on the banks of the Piave in the province of Belluno, in northeast Italy.

4,642 people work all together in Longarone, which is 112.62% of the total population, with most actual inhabitants working within the village.

Geography
The town is located on a road linking Belluno to Cortina d'Ampezzo, close to the borders of Veneto with Friuli-Venezia Giulia. Its nearest villages are Castellavazzo, Casso and Erto.

History
There is evidence of Roman presence in the site of Longarone. In the regions of Fortogna and Pirago tombs have been discovered, and at Dogna, a burial site with coins, rings, bracelets, clay jars and a plaque dedicated to Asclepius, a Greco-Roman god (demigod) of medicine. Remains of a Roman road were also found.

But the early story of the city is not clear until the establishment of the municipality by Napoleon Bonaparte in 1806.

In the Middle Ages and modern era, the city was subject to the social and political events taking place in Belluno, being dominated by several groups and families, such as the Vescovi, the Ezzelino Romano in 1250, the Scala family in 1300, the families of Carrara and Visconti and the Venetian State domination in 1420.

Longarone was the site of a battle in World War I, in which a few companies of German troops led by Erwin Rommel successfully captured an entire Italian division of over 10,000, retreating after the Battle of Kobarid (Caporetto). Rommel was awarded his Pour le Mérite medal for this achievement.

Dam disaster 
The village was destroyed in the Vajont Dam disaster on October 9, 1963, when a landslide from Monte Toc forced  of water over the top of the Vajont Dam.  Longarone lay in the immediate path of the wave of mud and water which swept into the valley below.  1,917 villagers were killed.

Longarone was rebuilt following the tragedy and is now once again a thriving community.  The fortieth anniversary of the disaster was marked, in October 2003, by a commemorative ceremony in Longarone attended by President of the Republic Carlo Azeglio Ciampi.

Twin towns
 Urussanga, Brazil
 Bagni di Lucca, Italy

References

External links 

 Longarone official site

Cities and towns in Veneto